Ernest Thierry Anang (born 7 December 1994) is an Cameroonian footballer who plays for Al Dhaid as a forward.

References

External links
 
 

1994 births
Living people
People from West Region (Cameroon)
Cameroonian footballers
Association football forwards
Panthère du Ndé players
Espérance Sportive de Tunis players
Stade Tunisien players
ES Métlaoui players
AS Marsa players
Safa SC players
Al-Ahli Club (Manama) players
Al-Thoqbah Club players
Al Dhaid SC players
Elite One players
Tunisian Ligue Professionnelle 1 players
Lebanese Premier League players
Bahraini Premier League players
Saudi Second Division players
UAE First Division League players
Cameroonian expatriate footballers
Expatriate footballers in Tunisia
Cameroonian expatriate sportspeople in Tunisia
Expatriate footballers in Lebanon
Cameroonian expatriate sportspeople in Lebanon
Expatriate footballers in Bahrain
Cameroonian expatriate sportspeople in Bahrain
Expatriate footballers in Oman
Cameroonian expatriate sportspeople in Oman
Expatriate footballers in Saudi Arabia
Cameroonian expatriate sportspeople in Saudi Arabia
Expatriate footballers in the United Arab Emirates
Cameroonian expatriate sportspeople in the United Arab Emirates